Humour in Islam refers to the act of doing things that are considered humorous under the guidelines set by the Quran and the Islamic prophet Muhammad.

Islamic sources on humour
Laughter, fun, and joking are permissible in Islam provided guidelines from the Quran and ahadith are followed. For humor to be in accordance with Islam, the joke should not be blasphemous and should be within the limits adab (manners).

Hadiths
1) Muhammad used to smile, rather than laugh.
Aisha, wife of the Prophet Muhammad narrated:

2) Muhammad's smile and his companions' laughing sessions.
Jabir ibn Samurah narrated:

3) Aisha also narrated:

4) Muhammad encouraged to be jestful with your family.
Ibn Mas'ud narrated that the Prophet Muhammad said;

5) Abu Dharr al-Ghifari narrated that Muhammad said;

6) Muhammad discouraged laughing at inappropriate times.
Al-Aswad ibn Yazid narrated:

7) Muhammad encouraged jokes about the truth.
Abu Hurairah narrated that;

8) Muhammad discouraged lying to make people laugh

9) Muhammad discouraged frightening anyone as a joke.

10) Muhammad discouraged joking or laughing excessively.

Muhammad said:
Muhammad discouraged backbiting and inappropriate language:

Jokes of Muhammad
Muhammad is reported by Tirmidhi to have said: "Why are there no old women in heaven? Because they become young girls when they get there."

Other instances include a man who came up to Muhammad to ask him to give him a beast to ride. The Prophet jokingly told him, "I will give you the offspring of a she-camel to ride." He said, "O Messenger of Allah, what will I do with the offspring of a she-camel?" The Prophet said: "Are riding-camels born except from she-camels?" (Reported by Ahmad ibn Hanbal, Abu Dawud and al-Tirmidhi, as Sahih).

Companions 
The Prophet's companions would limit jokes, joke at appropriate times, and be cautious of joking.

Umar ibn al-Khattab narrated that;

Sa`d ibn Abi Waqqas said;

Umar ibn Abd al-Aziz said;
In al-Adab al-Mufrad, Bukhari reports from Bakr ibn 'Abdillah who said: "The Companions of the Prophet used to throw melon-rinds at one another, but when the matter was serious, they were the only true men."

Quran

 The Quran discourages insulting anyone.

 The Qur'an discourages mocking Islam.

Classical treatise
Al Jihaz wrote a ‘Treatise on seriousness and playfulness.’ Ibn Qutaybah observed that early Muslims did not dislike joking. Writing in his Akhbar al hamqa ("History of Fools") the classical scholar Ibn al-Jawzi commented, "Humor serves as a much needed natural relaxation, and is approved for this purpose by many statements of Prophet Muhammad and the early Muslims."

Recent trends

Acceptance 
Since 9/11, there has been an increase in the number of  Muslim comedians and humour festivals. Prominent Muslim comedians include Nabil Abdul Rashid, Azhar Usman, Ahmed Ahmed, and Dean Obeidallah. Azhar Usman blames the media for misrepresenting humor in Islam. "The fact is that within Muslim culture there is a strong tradition of storytelling, joking and laughing. The relationship between Islam and comedy goes to the roots of the religion." However, American comedian Mohammed Amer asserts that it is  Muslims who have made a “terrible job” of communicating with the outside world.

In 2017, in response to the "Real Housewives of ISIS", a parody of "Real Housewives" broadcast by BBC2 show Revolting, the idea provoked widespread outrage and hilarity on Facebook.

See also

Allah Made Me Funny
Axis of Evil Comedy Tour
Fear of a Brown Planet
List of Muslim comedians
Looking for Comedy in the Muslim World
Ramadan Roundup
The Muslims Are Coming!
The Bible and humor
Muslim meme

References

Further reading
Shah, Idries. (1978). Special Illumination: Sufi Use of Humour, outlining the jokes' dual function as humour and teaching stories.
Shah, Idries. The Exploits of the Incomparable Mulla Nasrudin, illustrated by Richard Williams
Shah, Idries. The Subtleties of the Inimitable Mulla Nasrudin, illustrated by Richard Williams.
Shah, Idries. The Pleasantries of the Incredible Mulla Nasrudin, illustrated by Richard Williams and Errol Le Cain
Qishtayni, Khalid. (1985). Arab Political Humour

External links
Humour in Islam

 
Islamic culture